The Alliance-Sebring Twins was a short-lived minor league baseball club representing Sebring and Alliance, Ohio, in the Ohio–Pennsylvania League. The team played for just part of the league's 1912 season. On July 15, 1912, the team disbanded due to player strike. The team had posted a 26–33 record, prior to disbanding.

Baseball teams established in 1912
Sports clubs disestablished in 1912
Defunct minor league baseball teams
Professional baseball teams in Ohio
1912 establishments in Ohio
1912 disestablishments in Ohio
Defunct baseball teams in Ohio
Baseball teams disestablished in 1912
Ohio-Pennsylvania League teams